The Brain That Wouldn't Die is a 2020 satirical remake of the 1962 American science fiction horror film of the same name. It was directed by Derek Carl and premiered at the Portland Horror Film Festival. Per Starburst magazine, the film is nearly a shot-by-shot remake of the original.

Synopsis 
Dr. Bill Cortner is a brilliant doctor that has gone mad after decapitating his fiancée Jan in a car accident. He steals her head and succeeds in reanimating it, much to Jan's horror. Cortner is not content with merely bringing her head back to life—he wants to give her an all new body, but must resort to unsavory and deadly measures to obtain one.

Cast 

 Rachael Perrell Fosket as Jan Compton
 Patrick D. Green as Dr. Bill Cortner
 David Withers as William Cortner
 Jason Reynolds as Kurt
 Robert Blanche as Detective Mancini
 Mia Allen as Doris Powell
 Julia Bray as Roxanne
 Gaelle Lola Beauvais as Lady Marmalade
 Alex Tiefenthaler as The Thing
 Kristen Mortensen as Donna Williams
 Kelsey Norene as Jeanie Reynolds
 Bethany Jacobs as Bonnie
 Devon Rawlings as Paula

Production 
Funding for The Brain That Wouldn't Die was partially obtained through a successful Kickstarter campaign. Filming took place in Portland, Oregon during 2016 and actors Rachael Perrell Fosket, Patrick Green, Jason Reynolds, Mia Allen, and Robert Blanche were brought on to portray the film's central characters. Inspiration for The Brain That Wouldn't Die was taken from the original movie, as well as from films such as Re-Animator and The Man With Two Brains.

Release 
The Brain That Wouldn't Die premiered at the Hollywood Theatre as part of the Portland Horror Film Festival on June 21, 2020.

Reception 
Critical reception has been mixed to positive and the film holds a rating of 67% on Rotten Tomatoes, based on 6 reviews. Rue Morgue and Dread Central both wrote favorable reviews for the movie and Dread Central wrote that "It’s far from perfect in a technical sense, but we’re talking about art, not bricks. Technicalities be damned, I had fun watching this movie." Starburst was more critical, questioning "what’s the thinking behind doing an almost shot-for-shot version of a 1962 cult favourite rather than attempt to better it?"

References

External links 

 
 

2020 horror films
2020 science fiction horror films
American science fiction horror films
American independent films
2020s English-language films
Mad scientist films
2020s American films